Pech Merle is a cave which opens onto a hillside at Cabrerets in the Lot département of the Occitania region in France, about 32 km by road east of Cahors. It is one of the few prehistoric cave painting sites in France that remain open to the general public. Extending over 2 kilometres over two levels, of which only  are open to the public, are caverns, wells and sloping tunnels, the walls of which are painted with dramatic murals dating from the Gravettian culture (some 25,000 years BC). Some of the paintings and engravings, however, may date from the later Magdalenian era (16,000 years BC).

This cave was created over 2 million years ago by an underground river, cutting channels which were later used by humans for shelter and eventually for mural painting. The galleries are mostly dry, 10 meters wide on average. The height under the vault is between 5 and 10 meters high.

The cave art located in the deeper areas of the cave was discovered in 1922 by Marthe David, age 13; her brother Andre David, age 16 and Henri Dutetre, age 15.The three teenagers had been exploring the cave for two years. Like other children of the area, these three had been encouraged and assisted in their exploration by Father Amedee Lemozi, the curate of Cabrerets and an amateur archaeologist who had discovered other cave paintings in the region.

The walls of seven of the chambers at Pech Merle have fresh, lifelike images of woolly mammoth, spotted horses, single colour horses, bovids, reindeer, handprints, and some humans. Footprints of children, preserved in what was once clay, have been found more than  underground. In 2013 the Tracking in Caves-project tested experience based reading of prehistoric footprints by specialised trackers of Ju/'hoansi San with great success. Within a  radius of the site are ten other caves with prehistoric art of the Upper Palaeolithic period, but none of these are open to the public.

During the Ice Age the caves were very probably used as places of refuge by prehistoric peoples when the area had an Arctic climate, very cold temperatures, and native animal species very different from those of the present day. It is supposed that, at some point in the past, rain and sliding earth covered the cave entrances with an airtight seal until the 20th century.

Experimental reconstruction work by French archaeologist Michel Lorblanchet has suggested that the application of the paint for some of the paintings was probably by means of a delicate spitting technique.

The cave at Pech Merle has been open to the public since 1926. Visiting groups are limited in size and number so as not to destroy the delicate artwork with the excessive humidity, heat and carbon dioxide produced by breathing.

Dapple horses of Pech Merle
The paintings "Dappled Horses of Pech Merle", approximately 25,000 years old, depict spotted horses that look remarkably similar to the leopard pattern common in modern Appaloosas. Archaeologists have debated whether the artists were painting real horses they had observed or whether the spotting had some symbolic meaning. A 2011 study using the DNA of ancient horses, however, found that the leopard complex, which is involved in leopard spotting, was present, and concluded that the cave painters most likely did see real spotted horses.  But there is no way of definitively knowing artist intent.

Prehistoric signatures of Pech Merle
A well-preserved image of a hand was also found in the cave. The "signature" is approximately 18,000 years b.c. According to the thinner wrist, it is probably a female hand. Depictions of hands have been discovered in many prehistoric caves. The painter put his hand on the wall and sprayed it with paint. Similar "imprints" were also left behind by the original inhabitants of Australia. To this day, archaeologists are not sure whether it was a kind of signature or a simple "I was here" message.

References

External links
 Pech Merle, website of the Centre de Prehistoire du Pech Merle
 Genetic tests throw new light on French cave painting RFI English
 Heslewood Author of "Chapters from the history of painting"

Prehistoric art
Caves containing pictograms in France
Art of the Upper Paleolithic
Show caves in France
Tourist attractions in Lot (department)
Caves of Lot (department)
Stone Age sites in France